A chord of a circle is a straight line segment whose endpoints both lie on a circular arc. If a chord were to be extended infinitely on both directions into a line, the object is a secant line. More generally, a chord is a line segment joining two points on any curve, for instance, an ellipse. A chord that passes through a circle's center point is the circle's diameter. 
The word chord is from the Latin chorda meaning bowstring.

In circles 

Among properties of chords of a circle are the following:
 Chords are equidistant from the center if and only if their lengths are equal.
 Equal chords are subtended by equal angles from the center of the circle.
 A chord that passes through the center of a circle is called a diameter and is the longest chord of that specific circle.
 If the line extensions (secant lines) of chords AB and CD intersect at a point P, then their lengths satisfy AP·PB = CP·PD (power of a point theorem).

In conics
The midpoints of a set of parallel chords of a conic are collinear (midpoint theorem for conics).

In trigonometry 

Chords were used extensively in the early development of trigonometry. The first known trigonometric table, compiled by Hipparchus, tabulated the value of the chord function for every  degrees. The circle was of diameter 120, and the chord lengths are accurate to two base-60 digits after the integer part.

The chord function is defined geometrically as shown in the picture. The chord of an angle is the length of the chord between two points on a unit circle separated by that central angle. The angle θ is taken in the positive sense and must lie in the interval  (radian measure). The chord function can be related to the modern sine function, by taking one of the points to be (1,0), and the other point to be, and then using the Pythagorean theorem to calculate the chord length:

  

The last step uses the half-angle formula. Much as modern trigonometry is built on the sine function, ancient trigonometry was built on the chord function. Hipparchus is purported to have written a twelve-volume work on chords, all now lost, so presumably, a great deal was known about them. In the table below (where c is the chord length, and D the diameter of the circle) the chord function can be shown to satisfy many identities analogous to well-known modern ones:

The inverse function exists as well:

See also
Circular segment - the part of the sector that remains after removing the triangle formed by the center of the circle and the two endpoints of the circular arc on the boundary.
Scale of chords
Ptolemy's table of chords
Holditch's theorem, for a chord rotating in a convex closed curve
Circle graph
Exsecant and excosecant
Versine and haversine
Zindler curve (closed and simple curve in which all chords that divide the arc length into halves have the same length)

References

Further reading

External links 

 History of Trigonometry Outline
 Trigonometric functions , focusing on history
Chord (of a circle) With interactive animation

Circles
Curves
Geometry